The Petit Vélan is a mountain of the Swiss Pennine Alps, located south of Bourg-Saint-Pierre in the canton of Valais. It lies NW of Mont Vélan.

References

External links
 Petit Vélan on Hikr

Mountains of the Alps
Alpine three-thousanders
Mountains of Switzerland
Mountains of Valais